Mariental may refer to:

Places
Mariental, Germany, a settlement in the district of Helmstedt, Lower Saxony, Germany
Mariental, Namibia, a settlement in the Hardap Region, Namibia
Mariental, a valley near the Katzenbuckel located in Elztal, Germany
Mariental, Switzerland, a valley in the canton of Lucerne, Switzerland
Mariental, former name of Sovetskoye, Saratov Oblast, Russia

Administrative units
 Mariental Rural, a constituency around the Namibian city of Mariental
 Mariental Urban, a constituency of the Namibian city of Mariental

See also
Marienthal (disambiguation)